Carol Sloane (March 5, 1937 – January 23, 2023) was an American jazz singer.

Biography
Born in Providence, Rhode Island, she began singing professionally when she was 14, although for a time in the 1970s she worked as a legal secretary in Raleigh, North Carolina. In addition, between September 1967 and May 1968, she occasionally wrote album reviews for Down Beat. She lived in Stoneham, Massachusetts.

One of her early efforts was working with Les and Larry Elgart's orchestra. Later she filled in for Annie Ross of Lambert, Hendricks & Ross. By 1961, success at the Newport Jazz Festival led to albums for Columbia Records. Her career stalled for a time in the 1970s, but resumed by the 1980s. In 1983 she found a nickel under her carseat and brought it to a psychic who told her she should sign with Concord Records; then she had some successes touring in Japan. In 1986, she married Buck Spurr. In April 2016 Sloane was among the inductees into the Rhode Island Music Hall of Fame (RIMHOF).

She died on January 23, 2023, due to complications from a stroke she had two years prior.

Sloane: A Jazz Singer, a documentary feature film profiling her career, is currently in production.

Discography

As leader
 Live at 30th Street (Columbia, 1962)
 Out of the Blue (Columbia, 1962)
 Subway Tokens (Moonbeam, 1975)
 Spring Is Here  (LDC, 1977)
 Carol & Ben with Ben Webster (Honeydew, 1977)
 Carol Sings (Progressive, 1979)
 Cottontail (Choice, 1979)
 Summertime Carole Sings Again (LDR, 1983)
 As Time Goes by (Eastwind, 1984)
 Three Pearls with Ernestine Anderson, Chris Connor (Eastworld, 1984)
 Sophisticated Lady (Audiophile, 1985)
 But Not for Me (CBS/Sony, 1987)
 Hush-a-Bye (SSJ, 1987)
 Love You Madly (Contemporary, 1989)
 The Real Thing (Contemporary, 1990)
 Heart's Desire (Concord Jazz, 1992)
 Sweet and Slow (Concord Jazz, 1993)
 When I Look in Your Eyes (Concord Jazz, 1994)
 The Songs Carmen Sang (Concord, 1995)
 The Songs Sinatra Sang (Concord, 1996)
 The Songs Ella & Louis Sang with Clark Terry (Concord Jazz, 1997)
 Romantic Ellington (DRG, 1999)
 Something Cool (Choice, 2001)
 I Never Went Away (HighNote, 2001)
 Whisper Sweet (HighNote, 2003)
 Dearest Duke (Arbors, 2007)
 We'll Meet Again (Arbors, 2010)
 Live At Birdland (Club44, April 2022)

As guest
With Ken Peplowski
 Dearest Duke (Arbors)

References

External links
 Carol Sloane's website
 Carol Sloane discography at jazzdiscography.com
 
 

1937 births
2023 deaths
American jazz singers
American women jazz singers
Contemporary Records artists
Musicians from Providence, Rhode Island
People from Stoneham, Massachusetts
Jazz musicians from Massachusetts
HighNote Records artists
Concord Records artists
Arbors Records artists
Columbia Records artists
21st-century American women